In human mitochondrial genetics, Haplogroup G is a human mitochondrial DNA (mtDNA) haplogroup.

Origin
Haplogroup G is a descendant of haplogroup M. Haplogroup G is divided into subclades G1, G2, G3, and G4.

Distribution
It is an East Asian haplogroup. Today, haplogroup G is found at its highest frequency in indigenous populations of the lands surrounding the Sea of Okhotsk. Haplogroup G is one of the most common mtDNA haplogroups among modern Ainu, Siberian, Mongol, Tibetan and Central and North Asian Turkic peoples people (as well as among people of the prehistoric Jōmon culture in Hokkaidō). It is also found at a lower frequency among many other populations of East Asia, Central Asia, Bangladesh, Sri Lanka, and Nepal. However, unlike other mitochondrial DNA haplogroups typical of populations of northeastern Asia, such as haplogroup A, haplogroup C, and haplogroup D, haplogroup G has not been found among indigenous peoples of the Americas.

Table of Frequencies by ethnic group

Subclades
Subclade G2 is the most widely distributed, being found with low frequency in many populations all the way from eastern Europe (Poles, Ukrainians, Lipka Tatars) and western Siberia (Mansi, Khanty) to Japan (Japanese, Ainu) and from Iran (Persian) to southern China (Hmong and Tujia in Hunan and Mien in Guangxi) and Southeast Asia (Myanmar, Thailand, Cambodia). G2 (and especially its subclade G2a) is notably frequent among many Mongolic- or Turkic-speaking populations of northern East Asia and Central Asia. G2a also has been found with high frequency in some samples of Tharus from southern Nepal. The subclade G2a3 has been observed in Russia, an Azeri in Iran, and a Uyghur in Artux, Xinjiang, China; its subclade G2a3a has been observed among Komis and Udmurts. Subclade G2a4 has been observed in China, Taiwan, and in a Ukrainian from the Lviv region of western Ukraine. Subclade G2a5 has been observed in Japan, Korea, and among Buryats, Barghuts, and various Turkic peoples (Karachay, Balkar, Kyrgyz, Kazakh, Karakalpak, Telengit, Tubalar, Yakut).

Subclade G1 is almost completely responsible for the high frequency of haplogroup G in populations located around the Sea of Okhotsk (Itelmen, Koryak, Negidal, Ulch, Ainu, Chukchi, Nivkh, etc.). G1 in Luoravetlans (Koryak & Chukchi) is essentially G1b, and this subclade is also found with generally low frequency in populations of Yakutia to the west (Evens, Yukaghirs, Evenks, Yakuts, Dolgans) as well as in Japan. G1a has been found in samples from China (Daur, Hui, Kazakh, Sarikoli, Korean, Manchu, Yi, Jino, Yunnan Dai, Jiangxi Han, and a sample of the general population of the city of Shenyang), Tajikistan (Pamiris), Japan, Korea, Vietnam, and central Siberia (Yakut, Altai-kizhi). G1c has been found in China, Korea, and a Seletar.

Subclade G3 is relatively rare. It has been found mainly among Koreans, Tibetans, and presently Turkic- or Mongolic-speaking populations in southern Siberia and vicinity, and occasionally among Evenks in Buryatia, Japanese, Pumi, Naxi, Uyghurs, Sarikolis, Tajiks, Pashtuns and Hazaras in Afghanistan, Kashmir, Han Chinese in Sichuan, Hmong and Tujia in western Hunan, and Vietnamese.

Subclade G4 has been found in Japan and possibly in one Chinese individual from Guizhou.

Tree
This phylogenetic tree of haplogroup G subclades is based on the paper by Mannis van Oven and Manfred Kayser Updated comprehensive phylogenetic tree of global human mitochondrial DNA variation and subsequent published research.

G
G1
G1a
G1a1
G1a1a
G1a1a1
G1a1a2
G1a1a3
G1a2'3
G1a2
G1a3
G1a3a
G1b
G1c
G2
G2a
G2a1
G2a1a
G2a1b
G2a1c
G2a2
G2a3
G2a3a
G2a4
G2b
G2b1
G3
G3a
G3a1
G3a2
G3b
G3b1
G4

See also
Genealogical DNA test
Genetic genealogy
Human mitochondrial genetics
Population genetics
Human mitochondrial DNA haplogroups

References

External links

General
Ian Logan's Mitochondrial DNA Site
Mannis van Oven's Phylotree

G